Nassarius enzoi is a species of sea snail, a marine gastropod mollusc in the family Nassariidae, the Nassa mud snails or dog whelks.

Description
The length of the shell attains 13.1 mm

Distribution
This marine species occurs off Madagascar

References

 Bozzetti, L. (2007). Descrizione di due nuovi specie di Nassariidae (Gastropoda: Hypsogastropoda) dal Madagascar Meridionale. Malacologia Mostra Mondiale. 55: 7-9

Nassariidae
Gastropods described in 2007